Arrow Peak is a  summit of the Sierra Nevada in Fresno County, California, located within Kings Canyon National Park. Arrow Peak is situated at the north end of the Muro Blanco (also known as Arrow Ridge), a chain of high cliffs along the South Fork Kings River.

See also
List of mountain peaks of California

References

Mountains of Fresno County, California
Mountains of Kings Canyon National Park
North American 3000 m summits